The Indian cricket team toured South Africa for three Tests, five Odis & one T20I from 16 November 2006 to 6 January 2007.

South Africa won the Test series 2–1. After India won the first Test at New Wanderers Stadium in Johannesburg, South Africa rallied to win the 2nd Test at Kingsmead in Durban and the third Test at Newlands in Cape Town.
  
South Africa won the ODI series 4–0, which was India's first ODI series without a win since 1997.

There was also one Twenty20 International, which India won.

Schedule

Squads

Irfan Pathan sent back home before the second test due to poor bowling form.

Limited Over Matches

Tour Match: Rest of South Africa v Indians, 16 November

1st ODI

2nd ODI

3rd ODI

4th ODI 

Virender Sehwag captained India after Rahul Dravid was ruled out for rest of the series following an injury.  South Africa recovered from a bad start to reach 243 at the end of 50 overs. Gibbs remained unbeaten on 93 while Kallis and Pollock chipped in with 49 and 37 respectively. Anil Kumble was the best bowler for India on the day picking up 2 wickets for 42 runs. Chasing 244 under lights, India got off to a steady start losing their first wicket in the 6th over with 23 runs on the board.  Wickets fell at regular intervals and this meant that India never had a chance of overhauling the South African score. Irfan Pathan was the pick of the batsmen scoring 47 runs.

5th ODI 

India put on another abysmal batting performance scoring just 200 off the allocated 50 overs. Sachin Tendulkar topscored for the visitors with a sedate 55 off 97 balls.  Mongia and Dhoni chipped in with useful 40's.

South Africa reached the target in just 31.2 overs.  Pollock was named Man of the Match for his bowling performance which included 4 maidens and 2 wickets.

With this victory, South Africa wrapped up the series 4–0 with the first game washed out.

Only T20I

India pulled off its first victory of the tour with a close Twenty20 win after Dinesh Karthik steered India towards victory with a controlled innings by Twenty20 standards.  This was India's first Twenty20 International ever. Sachin Tendulkar announced his t20i retirement after this match.

Test Series

Tour Match: South Africa v India (7–10 December)

First Test

India beat South Africa by 123 runs and took a 1–0 lead in the series. This was also India's first test victory in South African soil.

Second Test

Third Test

Notes

External links
Series home at ESPN Cricinfo

2006 in Indian cricket
2006 in South African cricket
2006–07 South African cricket season
2007 in Indian cricket
2007 in South African cricket
2006-07
International cricket competitions in 2006–07